James C. “Jim” Mullen (born ca. 1958) was the president and CEO of Biogen Idec until he retired effective June 8, 2010. At the same time, he started he would retire from the board at the end of his term.  In 2011, he was named CEO to drug manufacturer Patheon, based in Durham, North Carolina, as well as to their board.  He stayed there until August 29, 2017.

Education
Mullen has a Bachelor of Science in chemical engineering from Rensselaer Polytechnic Institute and a Master of Business Administration from Villanova University.  He has been a trustee at Villanova since 2001.

Biogen
Mullen began his tenure at Biogen in 1992 and worked his way up the ladder.  In 1992, he became the VP of Operations followed by VP international in 1996.  Mullen became COO and president in 1999 and CEO in 2000.  In 2000, he became CEO of Biogen Idec. His tenure as CEO has been described this way: "Although the firm flourished in the early part of his tenure, it has struggled more recently to coax new products from its pipeline. In a May proxy filing, Carl Icahn noted that Mullen was paid $60.8 million in total compensation, combining salary, bonus, and stock options over the preceding five years, while Biogen’s stock declined from $66.61 to $47.63 [40% in value] in that time."  In 2005, the last time they brought a new drug to market (multiple sclerosis treatment Tysabri). Tysabri was "quickly pulled from the market after it was linked to a life-threatening brain infection in a handful of patients". When it returned in 2008, it brought in $589 million which was far less than anticipated.  This led to Carl Icahn demanding changes as he tried to gain more control over the board.

References

1950s births
American health care chief executives
American chief operating officers
Rensselaer Polytechnic Institute alumni
Villanova University alumni
Living people
Chief executives in the pharmaceutical industry